MXP may refer to:

In computing and telecommunications:
MXP (computing), a protocol in online gaming
Metropolitan Exchange Point, a major point-to-point location in computer networking, including:
Boston MXP

Other uses:
Milan Malpensa Airport, in Milan, Italy (IATA code)
Methoxphenidine, a dissociative drug
Mexican peso, before 1993 (obsolete ISO 4217 code)
Tlahuitoltepec Mixe, a language spoken in Mexico (ISO 639-3 code)